Grand Canyon is a 1949 American Western film starring Richard Arlen. It was the directorial debut of veteran editor Robert Landres and was financed by Robert L. Lippert. It was shot at the Nassour Studios.

Lippert assigned Carl Hittleman to produce the film after the success of I Shot Jesse James.

References

External links

Complete film at Internet Archive

1949 films
American Western (genre) films
Films directed by Paul Landres
Films scored by Albert Glasser
1949 Western (genre) films
Lippert Pictures films
American black-and-white films
1940s English-language films
1940s American films